A private limited company is any type of business entity in "private" ownership used in many jurisdictions, in contrast to a publicly listed company, with some differences from country to country. Examples include the LLC in the United States, private company limited by shares in the United Kingdom, GmbH in Germany and Austria, société à responsabilité limitée in France, and sociedad de responsabilidad limitada in the Spanish-speaking world. The benefit of having a private limited company is that there is limited liability. However, shares can only be sold to shareholders in the business, which means that it can be difficult to liquidate such a company.

Abbreviations

Albania
In Albania a limited liability company is a commercial company founded by persons of physical or judicial status, who are not liable for the company and personally bear losses only up to the outstanding contribution agreements. Partners' contributions constitute the registered capital of a limited liability company. Each partner has his quota in the company in proportion to the contribution of the capital so the registered capital of the company is divided between the partners based on the proportional ratio of their contribution. In Albania a limited liability company may not have a capital of less than 100 lek.

Argentina
Although not an exact equivalent, the Argentine variant of the LLC is called Sociedad de Responsabilidad Limitada (S.R.L.) and it limits the liability of its members up to their capital contribution in the company. The equity is divided into equal stakes (can not be called "shares"), each one of which represents a percentage of the company and that can not be traded on the stock exchange. Their by-laws are regulated by law N° 19550 and the commercial partnership is limited to a maximum of 50 partners.

Bolivia 
In Bolivia, the LLC variant is called Sociedad de Responsabilidad Limitada (S.R.L.). These companies' legal framework consist in the Trade Code (Decree Law N° 14379 of February 25, 1977), its modifications and other supplementary laws. The members participate in it through capital stakes, and their liability is limited to the value of their contributions. The number of members must be minimum 2 and maximum 25.

Bosnia and Herzegovina
Bosnian and Herzegovinian legislation, similarly to that in Serbia, Montenegro, North Macedonia contemplates LLCs as društvo s ograničenom odgovornošću (d.o.o.). Companies using this structure append the abbreviation d.o.o. to their company name. A shareholder or member in a d.o.o. is only personally liable up to the value of the member's investment in the company.

Brazil
The corporate structure in Brazilian law most similar to the American LLC is the Sociedade Limitada (“Ltda.”), under the new Brazilian Civil Code of 2002. The sociedade limitada is the new name of the sociedade por quotas de responsabilidade limitada, and it can be organized as empresária or simples, under this new code, roughly corresponding to the form types of comercial (“commercial”) and civil (“non commercial”) of the Commercial Code. A new law in Brazil has made it legal to obtain an LLC by a sole-proprietor in two forms: Empresa Individual de Responsabilidade Limitada (Eireli for short), or Sociedade Unipessoal Limitada (“Ltda.”). The main requirement for an Eireli is a capital of 100 times the current minimum wage, R$ 78.800,00 (US$26.267.00) as of 2015; whereas for a Sociedade Unipessoal Limitada the same rules apply as for other Sociedades Limitadas

Bulgaria
Bulgarian legislation corresponds LLCs (Ltd, GmbH, SARL, etc.) as "Дружество с ограничена отговорност" (Druzhestvo s ogranichena otgovornost; company with limited liability). Companies incorporated under this structure append the cyrillic abbreviation ООД (Latin script: OOD) to their name. In the case of an LLC incorporated with a sole-shareholder/member (sole-ownership), this is designated and known as "Еднолично дружество с ограничена отговорност" (Ednolichno druzhestvo s ogranichena otgovornost; sole-ownership company with limited liability) and abbreviated as ЕООД (EOOD). The EOOD specifically, is exempted from annual, general or extraordinary meetings for making decisions and may just issue written resolutions.

Chile
Chilean law contemplates a certain form of LLC known as "Sociedad de Responsabilidad Limitada" (Limited Liability Association). Also (LLC) These companies are regulated by law N° 3.918. Among their most important characteristics we can say that:
 They can pursue a commercial or non-commercial purpose (Sociedad Comercial de Responsabilidad Limitada / Sociedad Civil de Responsabilidad Limitada).
 They must be formed by two or more partners and can hold up to a maximum of fifty.
 Their equity is divided into "cuotas" (not shares) each one of which represents a percentage of the company.
 They can be managed by one or more managers (external if need be), or by a board of directors.
 Their by-laws can't be modified, nor their partners be changed, without the consent of all the other partners.
 In tax considerations, they differ from the LLC's because they pay a corporate tax for their income, amount that can be deducted by their owners as a credit against the taxes they pay.

Chilean law also contemplates a very special kind of individual owner LLC called Empresa Individual de Responsabilidad Limitada (Limited Liability Individual Company), which uses the E.I.R.L. aggregation.

Colombia
Colombian legislation contemplates a very similar structure as mentioned above in the Chilean case. The Ltda. abbreviation is also used in Colombia.

Croatia
In Croatia, a private limited liability company is termed društvo s ograničenom odgovornošću (literal: limited liability company), abbreviated d.o.o.. A public limited liability company is termed a dioničko društvo (literal: joint stock company) abbreviated d.d..

Czech Republic
Czech legislation contemplates LLCs as společnost s ručením omezeným (s.r.o. or spol. s r.o.). An s.r.o. is not technically comparable to an LLC because the profits are still subject to double taxation. Czech law does not offer a possibility to start up a limited company without the possibility of avoiding double taxation. As of 2014 the liability is not limited in Czech, since managing director (jednatel, mandatory board member in Czech LLCs) bears full liability that extends to all of his/her property, including private one.

Denmark
The Danish form of the LLC is the kommanditselskab (K/S). There is no minimum capital requirements. In a K/S there are two types of shareholders, the komplementar which is fully liable, and the kommanditist which liability is limited. The K/S is a tax-transparent company, which means the income "passes through" the company directly to the shareholders.

Dominican Republic
Dominican Republic legislation contemplates LLCs as Sociedad de Responsabilidad Limitada, also known by their abbreviation S.R.L.;; S.R.L.s award limited liability to their members up to their contribution in the company (i.e., contribution of capital). This type of company began after the law number 479 of the year 2008.

Estonia
The Estonian version of private limited company (limited liability company) is called osaühing (OÜ). The type of entity is also required to be identified in the name.
An OÜ is taxed as a corporation. The minimum capital required by law is €2,500.

Finland
Although not an exact equivalent, the Finnish version of the LLC is the Oy (osakeyhtiö) or in Swedish Ab (aktiebolag). An Oy is taxed as a corporation. Since 1 July 2019, there is no minimum capital required by law.

Germany
Because of its hybrid characteristics it is very difficult to determine the German equivalent. On one hand it is possible to consider it as a kind of Gesellschaft mit beschränkter Haftung (GmbH) because it has aspects of a corporation; on the other hand it could be considered to be a kind of Kommanditgesellschaft (KG), which is the German equivalent of a limited partnership. Based on the literal translation of the word "company", an LLC should be considered to be a kind of KG without any liable partner. The German equivalent that comes closest to LLC, is GmbH & Co KG, a nested  Kommanditgesellschaft (KG) where a Gesellschaft mit beschränkter Haftung (GmbH) takes the role of the fully liable partner. For the purpose of taxation, the Bundesfinanzministerium (German Federal Ministry of Finance) gives detailed guidelines of the circumstances under which an LLC is to be considered to be a "corporation" or as a "limited partnership". It is useful to note, however, that the original LLC statutes of Wyoming and other US states were more or less explicitly modeled after the GmbH.

Greece
A limited liability company (LLC) in Greece is synonymous to an EPE (ΕΠΕ - Εταιρεία Περιορισμένης Ευθύνης).

Hong Kong
In Hong Kong, the Limited Company is the most commonly incorporated type of company and bears the characteristics of a Limited Liability Company. The core characteristics of a Hong Kong Limited Company include: i) it requires a minimum of one shareholder and one director (can be the same person), ii) a Hong Kong company requires a company secretary resident in HK, iii) foreign ownership is allowed, iv) company shareholders have limited liability and v) the company must have registered HK address.

Entrepreneurs who register a company in Hong Kong can choose a Hong Kong offshore company. This company structure is basically a HK Limited Company but all business is conducted outside of Hong Kong. The advantage of this structure is that all business income that is sourced outside of Hong Kong is tax exempt.

Hungary
Hungarian legislation contemplates LLCs as Korlátolt felelősségű társaság. Companies working under this structure append the abbreviation Kft. to their name. Hungarian LLCs are required to have a 3 million HUF (Hungarian Forint) (approx. US$8,000) starting capital. The time of formation by the new electronic formation option has been reduced from 2 weeks to 2 hours, additional cost of formation is around 100,000 HUF (approx. US$270). Kft.s can be formed by the cooperation of lawyers.

The Hungarian Kft. is the most common form of doing business in Hungary. As being part of the European Union (EU), Hungarian Kft.s can now obtain an EU VAT registration number for doing business across the EU. The Hungarian EU-VAT reg. number starts with "HU". This way the existence of the subject company, VAT issues and the cross-check is available on the common EU website for companies.

 Iceland 
According to Icelandic legislation, there are two main types of LLC forms, private and public held limited liability forms. Private LLC is abbreviated "Ehf." The minimum capital of 500,000 Icelandic krónas (kr.). Public LLC is abbreviated "Hf." with minimum capital of 4,000,000 kr.

India
Almost 93 percent of the companies incorporated in India are registered as Private Limited Companies.

The Ministry of Corporate Affairs is the governing body which regulates all Private Limited Companies in India. The main law regulating Private Limited Companies is the Companies Act 2013.

A private limited company can have at most 200 members. A company with one member is referred to as a One Person Company.

The Companies Act, 2013 is the regulating Act along with the Rules (Delegated Legislation), Notices, Circulars and Notifications issued by the Ministry of Corporate Affairs.

Iran
As of 2015, there are seven types of companies which can be registered under Iran's company registration law. One of these seven types of companies and partnerships refers to LLPs. Like many other countries, two persons are required to form an LLP in Iran. Each person has his/her own shares and is responsible for business liability equivalent to his/her share percentage. LLPs in Iran are named according to the format illustrated by the following example: "Sherkat Ba Masooliyate Mahdood" translates as "Sherkat  شرکت  Company" + "Mahdood  محدود  Limited" + "Masooliyat  مسئولیت  Liability".

Italy
The Italian Civil Code, approved in 1942 and as amended by the Government Act 6/2003 and furthers modifications, mainly provides three forms of limited liability company:
 Società per azioni (S.p.A.): the minimum required starting capital for an SpA is €50,000. The capital is divided into shares (azioni) that can be transferred by endorsement or bought and sold on stock exchange. Only SpAs can be quoted in stock exchange market, issue corporate bonds, and other financial instruments. SpA form and a higher capital are required by law to operate in protected businesses (i.e. banks, leasing companies, etc.).
 Società a responsabilità limitata (Srl): the minimum required starting capital for an Srl is €10,000. Its capital is divided into stakes (quote) which can be bought or sold just by notarial act. Srls can issue corporate bonds but are subject to many limitations. Similar to the Srl is the Società Cooperativa a Responsabilità Limitata (Scarl) whose scope is not making profit but give benefits to stakes' holders.
 Società in accomandita per azioni (Sapa): the minimum required starting capital for a Sapa is €120,000 divided into shares. Sapas have a mixed liability scheme, where standard shareholders have limited liability while managing shareholders have full liability. Except this, SAPAs are exactly like SPAs even if uncommon.

Companies append the corresponding abbreviation to their company names.

Japan
Japan passed legislation in 1996 creating a new type of business organization, godo kaisha (J-LLC), a close variant of the American LLC. Japanese Tax authority does not consider J-LLC (Godo-Kaisha) a pass-through entity, but as a taxable entity.

 Latvia 
Limited liability company in Latvia is referred to as sabiedrība ar ierobežotu atbildību (SIA). SIA is taxed as a corporation. The minimum share capital required by law is €2,800. But it is allowed to set up SIA with share capital €1.00, but it must be increased to minimum share capital €2,800 by increasing share capital with money or by moving at least 25% from annual profit until capital will be €2,800.

Mexico
Mexican legislation contemplates LLCs as Sociedades de Responsabilidad Limitada (including Sociedades de Responsabilidad Limitada de Capital Variable), also known for their abbreviation "S. de R.L." (or "S de R.L. de C.V.") (limited liability company or limited liability company with/of variable capital). S. de R.L.'s award limited liability to its members up to their contribution in the company (i.e., contribution of capital) and also act as pass-through or flow-through entities whereby profits are "passed-through" to its members, avoiding double taxation. This type of company is widely used by foreign investors in Mexico because of its "pass-through" modality and its "check the box" capability under the IRC (Internal Revenue Code of the U.S.).

Moldova
Moldovan legislation contemplates LLCs as Societate cu Răspundere Limitată, abbreviated "S.R.L.", and are regulated member(s)-founder(s), and other non-founder members, minimum one member-founder and maximum total of 50 members, at least one of them must be the founder of the company, but all of the 50 could be also founders.

North Macedonia
Macedonian legislation contemplates LLCs as Друштво со ограничена одговорност (Drushtvo so ogranichena odgovornost). Companies working under this structure append the abbreviation д.о.о. (d.o.o.) to their name. The minimum required starting capital for a d.o.o. is €5,000.

Norway
In Norway, the closest to an LLC is probably the kommandittselskap (KS). In a K/S there are two types of participants, one  komplementar which is fully liable, and one or more kommandittist, with limited liability. There are minimum capital requirements. The KS is a tax-transparent company, which means the income "passes through" the company directly to the shareholders.

Pakistan
In Pakistan, LLCs are known as private companies that end (Local Liability Company) with Pvt. Ltd. They should have at least Rs. 100,000 as their minimum paid up capital.

The Securities and Exchange Commission of Pakistan (SECP) has made it mandatory for all listed companies to file their documents, returns, accounts and applications through the commission's eServices online filing facility, earlier, this requirement was only applicable to the companies, which had been incorporated through eServices online filing facility.

Peru
There is no direct equivalent of an LLC in Peru, but some similar corporate forms include:
 Sociedad anónima cerrada (S.A.C.), a corporation which must have at least two and not more than twenty shareholders; its shares may not be offered to the public and cannot be traded on the stock exchange.
 Sociedad comercial de responsabilidad limitada (S.R.L.), a commercial partnership divided in equal participations which may not be called "shares". It must have at least two and not more than twenty partners.
 Sociedad civil de responsabilidad limitada (S. Civil de R. L.), a professional partnership of at least two and not more than thirty individuals, with co-owner participation in the form of capital, of professional contribution, or of any combination of both.
 Empresa individual de responsabilidad limitada (E.I.R.L.), a legal entity with one single owner.

The capital for any of the above entities is freely determined by its statutes. There is no minimum requirement except for entities with certain types of activities, mainly in the financial markets, and then irrespective of their type.

Poland
In Poland, a limited liability company is referred to literally as “company with limited liability” (spółka z ograniczoną odpowiedzialnością, legally abbreviated as sp. z o.o. (or sometimes Sp. z o.o. in particular names). Informally, in the Polish speaking slang, it is abbreviated as spółka zoo (pronounced with a long "o", as in "tow."). However, sp. z o.o. has a (separate from its owners) legal personality, which gives it the ability to do certain actions under law, and it is considered a "corporation".

The minimum start capital is 5,000 PLN (since 2009; until then, 50,000 PLN).

Portugal
In Portugal, LLCs are called "Sociedades de Responsabilidade Limitada", that is, "company of limited responsibility", usually abbreviated Lda.. They are tax subject, and company shares cannot be sold in a public market, since 2006 the transference of them is not required to be done in the presence of a civil law notary, except if the company owns buildings, in the same way other major properties have to be sold. Nonetheless, the responsibility of the partners is limited to the capital share they hold, and the minimum capital required by law for a Lda. of €5000.
(In 2006 the PS Government, led by José Socrates, did reduce the minimum capital to €1, but in 2011 the new PSD Government, led by Pedro Passos Coelho, reinstated the €5000 minimum capital.)
The capital is not required to be deposited at the time of the registration of the company, instead the share holders have until 31 December of the year the registry was made.

Romania
Romania recognizes the limited liability company since 1990 under the name of societate cu răspundere limitată (S.R.L.), in which the owners are personally liable for the company obligations within the limit of their contribution to social capital. The minimum start capital is 200 RON which currently amounts to less than €50.

Russia
In Russia and certain other former Soviet countries, an entity with a somewhat similar structure is known as Общество с ограниченной ответственностью (Obshchestvo s ogranichennoy otvetstvennost'yu) (lit., "company with limited liability"), usually abbreviated OOO, or in some CIS countries as OcOO.

Although a Russian limited liability company shares the same name with an American LLC, it is different in many ways. Most importantly, a Russian LLC is not tax transparent: the company is taxed at the corporate level, and then, upon distribution of dividends, shareholders pay income tax (personal or corporate).

A limited liability company is the most popular form of legal undertaking in Russia for simple shareholding structures.

The minimum capital required is 10,000 Russian rubles.

Serbia
Serbia legislation contemplates limited company as Друштво са ограниченом одговорношћу but functioning it is more similar to limited partnership. For many other reasons for example as in the Czech Republic, a d.o.o. is not technically comparable to an LLC because the profits are still subject to double taxation. The minimum capital required by law is 100 RSD, which is currently less than €1. 

Slovakia
In Slovakia, the law contemplates spoločnosť s ručením obmedzeným (abbreviation spol. s r. o. or s. r. o.) or as the rough equivalent of a limited liability company. It is very popular form of business organization due to ensurance of limited liability in exchange for a relatively small investment into the registered capital. From one to 50 associates can found it through a founding agreement with minimum registered capital of €5000, minimum €750 per person, in money or other property. (§ 105–153 of Act. No 513/1991 Coll. – Commercial Code as amended.)

Slovenia
Slovenian legislation contemplates LLCs as družba z omejeno odgovornostjo. Companies working under this structure append the abbreviation d. o. o. to their name. The minimum required starting capital for a d. o. o. is €7,500. Due to the high cost and complicated bookkeeping of a real corporation, this is a more widespread form.

Spain
In Spain, LLCs are called Sociedad de responsabilidad limitada (SRL), "company of limited responsibility", or sociedad limitada (SL), or "limited partnership". They are tax subject, and company shares cannot be sold in a public market, the transference of them having to be done compulsorily in the presence of a civil law notary, in the same way other major properties have to be sold. Nonetheless, the responsibility of the partners is limited to the capital share they hold, and the minimum capital required by law for a S.L. is at least €3,000.

Sweden
Sweden has no equivalent of an LLC. The closest company form is the handelsbolag (lit.: "trade company"). The Swedish AB (aktiebolag; lit.: "share company"), like the handelsbolag, is a tax subject and is more similar to a US C Corporation than an LLC. The minimum capital required by law in a private company, privat aktiebolag, is SEK 25,000, although this may be in the form of assets as well as capital. The AB structure requires shareholders, a Board of Directors, and regular meetings of both, together with complete accounts once per year. Depending on the size of the AB, the accounts may have to be audited. Creation or purchase "off-the-shelf" of an AB is relatively cheap and tax effective, but liquidation of a created aktiebolag can be an expensive and time-consuming operation. Creation of public limited liability companies, or publikt aktiebolag, which can raise capital from the public, requires a minimum capitalization of SEK 500,000, however the overall regulation of public companies in Sweden, especially regarding accounting methods and taxes, is thorough and detailed.

Switzerland
The Swiss Code of Obligations provides for different kinds of companies with limited liability, the two most commonly used are:

Swiss Limited Liability Company:Unofficial translation of term pursuant to: Swiss Code of Obligations, Volume II, Company Law, Articles 552 – 964, English Translation of the Official Text, Swiss-American Chamber of Commerce, Zurich 1992 The terms for this kind of company used in the three official languages of the Swiss Confederation are as follows: In German Gesellschaft mit beschränkter Haftung (abbreviation: GmbH), in French Société à responsabilité limitée (abbreviation: S.à r.l. or SARL) and in Italian Società a Garanzia Limitata (abbreviation: SaGL). A Swiss LLC is similar to an LLC with respect to various matters, including the following: Members may also be natural persons, corporations, partnerships or other LLCs, the liability of a member of a Swiss LLC to pay for the LLC's obligations is limited to its capital contribution, a Swiss LLC may be either member-managed or manager-managed, and, unless otherwise provided for in the operating agreement, the members’ right to control or manage a Swiss LLC is proportionate to their individual membership interest. The membership interests in a Swiss LLC have to be registered and, thus, they may only be issued in the name of a member but not to the bearer.

Swiss CorporationSwiss Code of Obligations, articles 620ss (in English common law context usually translated as  company limited by shares): The terms for this kind of company used in the three official languages of the Swiss Confederation are as follows: In German Aktiengesellschaft (abbreviation: AG), in French Société Anonyme (abbreviation: SA) and in Italian Società Anonima (abbreviation: SA). A Swiss corporation is with respect to various matters different from an LLC (including a Swiss LLC): Most important is that a Swiss corporation may, neither by default nor by exercising any respective option provided by the Swiss law, be member-managed like an LLC, as the respective mandatory provisions of Swiss law provide that the board of directors has certain non-transferable duties. Furthermore, the shares of a Swiss corporation may also be issued to the bearer (bearer shares) and, thus, not only in the name of a holder (registered shares), which, however, applies to the membership interests in a Swiss LLC, which may only be registered.

Tajikistan
In Tajikistan, the same as in Russia, an entity with a somewhat similar structure is known as "Ҷамъияти дорои масъулияти маҳдуд", Chamiyti Doroi Masuliyti Machdud, abbreviated as "ҶДММ".
Thailand
Most kinds of commercial organisations with an annual turnover of more than ฿1,800,000.00 are supposed to register a Limited Company with verified capital of at least  ฿1,800,000.00 and pay VAT sales tax.
The process of incorporation is however complex and needs to be prepared by an accredited law firm or accountant. It includes the registration for VAT. The company registration number is the same as the Tax ID number which must then figure on all invoices and sales receipts with VAT breakdown shown separately. For most purposes, foreign nationals are not permitted to be share holders or declared board members although there are exceptions for very high level investors.

Turkey
Minimum capital should be 10,000 TL. That capital could be the minimum total capital of company. Number of founding shareholders (real persons or legal entities) could be minimum 1 and maximum 50. All or some of the shareholders could be foreign nationals. There is no issued stock certificates and all shareholders liability is limited to their registered capital amount. 1/4 of capital should be blocked in a Bank until procedure of registration ends. The equivalent of LLC for Turkish is Ltd. Şti. (Which means Limited Şirketi.)Ukraine
This type of entity has existed in Ukraine since the 1990s. LLC is the most common type of business entity in Ukraine. In Ukrainian, it is spelled "Товариство з обмеженою відповідальністю" (abbreviated – TОВ, TзОВ), in transliteration "Tovarystvo z Obmezhenoyu Vidpovidalnistyu," that is, "company with limited liability".

By Ukrainian law LLC is a legal person. Authorized capital of LLC is divided into shares (or stakes), the amount of which is determined by the charter. LLC is responsible to the creditors only with its assets. Legal entities (foreign or Ukrainian companies) individuals, regardless of their country of citizenship or residency can be the founders (participants) of LLC. Limited liability company can be formed either by one person or by several individuals or legal entities (corporations). Maximum number of participants (founders) of LLC in Ukraine is 100. Since 2014 registration procedure has been significantly simplified in Ukraine. Minimum amount of authorised capital is 1 (one) hryvnia (less than 0,04 US cents). There is no state fee for LLC formation.

By Ukrainian Law LLC dividend payment is possible after the declaration of company's income or profit to the fiscal/tax authorities and the approval of the income statement. Thus, regardless of the tax system, LLC can make dividend payments up to 4 times a year, or one time a quarter.

Taxation. LLC can be registered:— as corporate/profit tax (18% rate) with or without VAT (up to 20% rate, depends on product or service) tax payer;

— fixed tax rate (in transliteration "yediniy podatok" or "sproschena sistema opodatkuvannia") is a 5% rate from revenue, with or without (on request) VAT registration.

United Arab Emirates

A Limited Liability Company (LLC) is the most common type of registration in the UAE and is recommended where the purpose of the entity is to make sales within the region. 100% foreign ownership of such an entity is not permitted. 
Under the UAE Commercial Companies Law (CCL), foreign investors are permitted to hold up to 49 per cent equity ownership in UAE companies and 51 per cent of the equity must be held at all times by one or more UAE nationals. In accordance with Article (218) of the CCL a Limited Liability Company can be formed by a minimum of 2 and a maximum of 50 shareholders whose liability is limited to their shares in the capital of the company. Recent amendments to Article (217) of the CCL that came into force in June 2009 removed the requirement for minimum share capital (previously AED 300,000 in Dubai and AED 150,000 in other Emirates) allowing founders of a limited liability company the freedom to determine the company's share capital which could be less than the earlier prescribed bottom line. Shares of an LLC are not open for subscription by the public. Despite the split in shareholdings, profits may be divided in other ratios agreed upon, taking into consideration efforts of foreign partners in management, provision of technology or expertise. Responsibility for the management of a LLC can be vested in the foreign partner or UAE national partners or a third party. A LLC must appoint a minimum of one manager and up to a maximum of five managers for the business. Managers must be appointed by a Memorandum of Association or by a management contract, for a fixed term or an unlimited term. Unless the Memorandum of Association states otherwise, the manager has full powers of administration and management of the LLC.
LLC is not allowed to practice its activities in the UAE without a Trade License and Commercial Registration Certificate.

United Kingdom
The new form of limited liability partnership (LLP), created in 2000, is similar to a US LLC in being tax neutral: member partners are taxed at the partner level, but the LLP itself pays no tax. It is treated as a body corporate for all other purposes including VAT. Otherwise, all companies, including limited companies and US LLCs, are treated as bodies corporate subject to United Kingdom corporation tax if the profits of the entity belong to the entity and not to its members.

United States
In the United States, the term "privately held company" can either refer to a limited liability company or a corporation. By default, all corporations are privately held. Corporations have to get permission from the Securities and Exchange Commission (SEC) to offer shares to the public. As a result, all newly formed corporations are automatically classified as privately owned.

One of the big differences between a limited liability company (LLC) and a corporation is that a corporation can issue stock and an LLC cannot.

A limited liability company (LLC) is a relatively new business structure authorized by state statutes.

In the United States, the first limited liability company act appeared in Wyoming in 1977 as special interest legislation for an oil company. In 1980, the Internal Revenue Service issued a private letter ruling to an LLC formed under the Wyoming LLC Act, indicating that the IRS would treat the LLC as a partnership for federal tax purposes. However, later that year, the IRS proposed regulations that would deny partnership classification to any business entity in which no member bore personal responsibility for the entity's liabilities. In 1982, Florida adopted an LLC act modeled on Wyoming's LLC Act. Due to uncertainty over the tax treatment of LLCs, no other states introduced LLC legislation until after 1988. In 1988, the IRS issued a revenue ruling stating that it would treat a Wyoming-style LLC as a partnership for tax purposes. By 1996, nearly every state had enacted an LLC statute. The National Conference of Commissioners on Uniform State Laws adopted the Uniform Limited Liability Company Act in 1996 and revised it in 2006.

A potential disadvantage specific to the United States is that LLCs are not considered to be corporations for the purposes of federal civil procedure; they are instead treated as partnerships. This affects the applicability of diversity jurisdiction in cases involving LLCs, barring application of diversity jurisdiction when even one member of the LLC is a citizen of the same state as one of the opposing parties. Should one member of an LLC be a citizen of a state of which one of the opposing parties is a citizen, any case between the LLC and those parties must be heard in that state's courts; corporations enjoy a more complete legal personhood that only denies diversity jurisdiction when the opposing party is a citizen of the state in which the corporation is incorporated (most commonly Delaware for large corporations, which has a small population) or has its principal place of business.

AOL was set up as an LLC during its ownership by Time Warner from 2001 to 2008. There is a similar setup for BMW's American subsidiary, BMW of North America, LLC. Chrysler has been an LLC since restructuring during the auto industry bailout of 2009, owned by Fiat Chrysler Automobiles N.V.

See also
 Besloten vennootschap met beperkte aansprakelijkheid, a Belgian (bvba) and Dutch (bv) private limited company
 Société à responsabilité limitée'', LLCs in French speaking countries
 Incorporation (business)
 Limited Liability Partnership (LLP)
 List of company registers
 Types of business entity
 Wholly Foreign-Owned Enterprise

References

Legal entities
Types of business entity